Paul Berry, (born 8 April 1958), is an English former professional footballer who played for Oxford United and Witney United. He also had a brief spell at Norwich City before joining playing full-time at Oxford.

After retiring from playing professional football he managed Ardley United, Carterton, Bicester Town and Abingdon Town.

References

External links

Rage Online Profile

1958 births
Oxford United F.C. players
Living people
English footballers
Association football forwards
Footballers from Oxford
Witney Town F.C. players
English Football League players
Association football midfielders
English football managers
Ardley United F.C. managers
Carterton F.C. managers
Bicester Town F.C. managers
Abingdon Town F.C. managers